Remixes is a remix album from Phenomenal Handclap Band. It is a compilation of songs remixed from their first full-length album Phenomenal Handclap Band.

Track listing
Tears (Stallions Remix);– 8:19
15 to 20 (80Kidz Remix);– 4:50
Baby (Clock Opera Remix);– 4:58
All of the Above (T.H. White Remix);– 6:07
You'll Disappear (Munk Remix);– 6:40
Dim the Lights (Coco Electrik Remix);– 4:24
Give It a Rest (Snack & C'mish Remix);– 4:36
15 to 20 (Den Haan Remix);– 4:35
Testimony (Cosmodelica Remix);– 6:29
Baby (Virgil Howe Remix);– 5:04
The Martyr (Live KEXP Session);– 3:12
The Journey to Serra Da Estrela (Fujiya & Miyagi Remix);– 4:10

References
Thompson, P. (2009, August 13). Pitchfork. Phenomenal Handclap Band. Retrieved November 10, 2011 from http://pitchfork.com/reviews/albums/13376-the-phenomenal-handclap-band/
The Phenomenal Handclap Band (2011) . Retrieved November 10, 2011, from http://www.friendlyfirerecordings.com/Bands/PHCB/phcb.html
The Phenomenal Handclap Band - MP3, Disco D'or tonight  (2008). Retrieved November 10, 2011, from http://www.brooklynvegan.com/archives/2008/09/the_phenomenal.html
THE PHENOMENAL HANDCLAP BAND RELEASES (2010). Retrieved November 10, 2011, from http://www.gomma.de/gommareleases/handclapreleases/
The Phenomenal Handclap Band (2011). Retrieved November 10, 2011, from http://www.last.fm/music/The+Phenomenal+Handclap+Band
Landry. (2009, October 6). Luxury Wafers. Luxury Wafers Exclusive: The Phenomenal Handclap Band, Live@Chessvolt Studios with Video and mp3. Retrieved November 10, 2011 from http://luxurywafers.net/2009/10/luxury-wafers-exclusive-the-phenomenal-handclap-band-livechessvolt-studios-with-video-and-mp3/
Power, C. (2009, June 29). BBC. BBC Review. Retrieved November 10, 2011 from https://www.bbc.co.uk/music/reviews/v363
Phenomenal Handclap Band Discography (2011). Retrieved November 11, 2011, from http://www.discogs.com/artist/Phenomenal+Handclap+Band,+The

2010 remix albums